VSH News is a Baloch cable and satellite news network based in Karachi, Sindh, Pakistan.

In 2020, its transmission was suspended.

See also 

 List of news channels in Pakistan

References

External links

24-hour television news channels in Pakistan
Television channels and stations established in 2004